Astragalus atenicus, the Atenian astracantha, is a species of milkvetch that is endemic to Kvemo Kartli in eastern Georgia. It can be found on stony and rubbly sites, in the mid montane zone between elevations of 1,400–1,800 m. It is threatened by agricultural activities and road construction.

References

atenicus
Vulnerable plants
Endemic flora of Georgia (country)